Mastana is a 1954 Hindi film, starring Motilal in lead role.

Soundtrack

References

External links
 

1954 films
1950s Hindi-language films
Films directed by H. S. Rawail
Films scored by Madan Mohan
Indian drama films
1954 drama films
Indian black-and-white films